Lecanora pringlei is a species of lichen in the family Lecanoraceae. It was originally described in 1883 as Lecidea pringlei by American botanist Edward Tuckerman. Elke Mackenzie transferred it to Lecanora in 1939.

See also
List of Lecanora species

References

Lichen species
Lichens described in 1883
pringlei
Taxa named by Edward Tuckerman